John Henry Brown (1820–1895) was an American historian.

John Henry Brown may also refer to:

 John Henry Hobart Brown (1831–1888), Episcopal Bishop
 John Brown (British Army soldier) (1908–1965), British prisoner of war
 Jack Brown (footballer, born 1899) (1899–1962), English football player

See also
 John Henry Browne (born 1946), American attorney
John Brown (disambiguation)